John Beecham (1787–1856) was an English Wesleyan writer.

John Beecham may also refer to:

John Beecham, trombonist on The Kinks album ''Misfits
John Beecham, presumed 4th Baronet (1940–2011), of the Beecham baronets

See also
Jack Beacham (1902–1982), English footballer
Beecham